Alberto Socarrás Estacio, (Manzanillo, 19 September 1908 – New York City, 26 August 1987), was a Cuban-American flautist who played both Cuban music and jazz.

Socarras started learning the flute in 1915 with his mother, Dolores Estacio, and later joined the provincial music conservatory at Santiago de Cuba. He completed his studies at the Timothy Music Conservatory in New York, gaining the equivalent title to a doctorate in music. In the middle 1920s he moved to Havana to join the theatre orchestra of Arquimedes Pous, where his sister Estrella was playing the violin. He also played in one or two early Cuban jazz bands (Early Cuban jazz) before moving to the United States in 1927.

In the US he recorded with Clarence Williams in 1927 with his first flute solo taking place on "Shooting the Pistol" on the Paramount label that year, making him the earliest known jazz flute soloist (earlier even than Wayman Carver). He played with The Blackbirds revue between 1928 and 1933, and plays on Lizzie Miles's 1928 recording "You're Such a Cruel Papa to Me". In 1933 he played with Benny Carter, then led the all-female Cuban band Anacaona on a tour of Europe in 1934. In 1935 he played with Sam Wooding and led his own bands from 1935 into the 1940s; his sidemen included Edgar Sampson and Mongo Santamaría, and Cab Calloway as a singer. He also played with Erskine Hawkins in 1937. He made one recording session in 1935, with four numbers. He also recorded for RCA Victor in 1947 and SMC Pro-Arte c. 1950. He recorded again in 1955, cutting Afro Cuban versions of four Duke Ellington compositions. In 1956, he recorded two LPs for Decca. In 1959, he appeared on the exotic "Tambo!" LP by Tito Puente for RCA Victor.

In the 1950s he took part in Rod Serling's The Twilight Zone on TV, and offered concerts of cult music at the Carnegie Hall in New York. In the 60s he dedicated himself to teaching, but also made some recordings. In 1983 he was filmed by Gustavo Paredes playing the flute in a TV documentary Música.

References

Scott Yanow, [ Albert Socarras] at Allmusic
Leonard Feather and Ira Gitler, The Biographical Encyclopedia of Jazz. Oxford, 1999, p. 516.

1908 births
1987 deaths
Cuban jazz musicians
Jazz flautists
Cuban flautists
Cuban bandleaders
20th-century flautists